This article contains information about the literary events and publications of 1808.

Events
January 3 – The Examiner, "A Sunday paper, on politics, domestic economy, and theatricals", is established in London by John Hunt, edited by his brother Leigh Hunt.
January 30 – The Théâtre St. Philippe opens in New Orleans, United States.
September 20 – The first Theatre Royal, Covent Garden in London, established in 1732, is destroyed by fire along with most of the scenery, costumes and scripts. Rebuilding begins in December.

Uncertain date
Charles Thomson's Bible Translation from the Greek (Holy Bible, containing the Old and New Covenant) is printed by Jane Aitken in Philadelphia (United States).

New books

Fiction
James Norris Brewer – Mountville Castle
Stéphanie Félicité, comtesse de Genlis – The Earl of Cork
Sarah Green – Tankerville Family
Elizabeth Hamilton – The Cottagers of Glenburnie
Heinrich von Kleist – Die Marquise von O...
Francis Lathom – The Northern Gallery
Charles Maturin – The Wild Irish Boy
Karoline Pichler – Agathocles
Elizabeth Thomas – The Husband and Wife

Children
Ann Taylor and Jane Taylor – Hymns for Infant Minds

Drama
James Nelson Barker – The Indian Princess
Matthäus Casimir von Collin – Belas Krieg mit dem Vater (Béla's War with His Father)
Richard Cumberland – The Jew of Mogadore
Johann Wolfgang von Goethe – Faust: The First Part of the Tragedy (published)
 Theodore Hook – The Siege of St Quintin
Heinrich von Kleist
Penthesilea
The Broken Jug (Der zerbrochne Krug)
Adam Oehlenschläger
Baldur hin Gode
Hakon Jarl
 John Tobin – The School for Authors

Poetry
William Blake – Milton (probable date)
Friedrich Schiller – revised version of "Ode to Joy", which formed the basis for the lyrics of Beethoven's 9th Symphony
Friedrich Hölderlin
"Der Rhein"
"Patmos"
Walter Scott – Marmion

Non-fiction
Charles Fourier – The Theory of the Four Movements
J. F. Fries – Neue oder anthropologische Kritik der Vernunft (New Critique of Reason)
Johann Heinrich Jung – 
Karl Wilhelm Friedrich von Schlegel – 
Gotthilf Heinrich von Schubert –

Births
January 27 – David Strauss, German theologian and writer (died 1874)
February 5 – Carl Spitzweg, German poet (died 1885)
February 16 – Gustave Planche, French critic (died 1857)
March 16 – Hannah T. King, British-born American writer and pioneer (died 1886)
March 22 – Caroline Norton (née Caroline Sheridan), English poet, pamphleteer and social reformer (died 1877)
March 25 – José de Espronceda, Spanish poet (died 1842)
April 18 – Teréz Karacs, Hungarian novelist, poet and memoirist (died 1892)
May 22 – Gérard de Nerval, French poet and translator (died 1855)
June 17 – Henrik Wergeland, Norwegian poet (died 1845)
June 21 – John Critchley Prince, English poet (died 1866)
June 22 – Xavier Marmier, French writer and translator (died 1892)
June 28 – James Spedding, English author and editor (died 1881)
July 10 – Solomon Northup, African-American memoirist (died c. 1864)
September 9 – Wendela Hebbe, Swedish playwright, journalist and novelist (died 1899)
October 21 – Julia Maitland, English writer on India and children's writer (died 1864)
November 2 – Jules Amédée Barbey d'Aurevilly, French novelist (died 1889)
Unknown date – Harriet Ward, English non-fiction and fiction writer (died 1873)

Deaths
February 12 – Anna Maria Bennett, English novelist (born c. 1760)
April 4 – Lady Charlotte Murray, English writer and botanist (born 1854)
May 2 – John Collins, English poet and entertainer (born 1742)
September 5 – John Home, Scottish poet (born 1722)
September 13 – Saverio Bettinelli, Italian man of letters (born 1718)
September 25 – Richard Porson, English classicist (born 1757)
November 4 – Melchiore Cesarotti, Italian poet (born 1730)
December 28 – John Duncan, English miscellanist (born 1721)
c. November/December – Nólsoyar Páll, Faroese merchant and poet, lost at sea (born 1766)

Uncertain date
Maria Riddell – West Indies-born poet, naturalist and travel writer (born 1772)

References

 
Years of the 19th century in literature